Major Herbert Mackworth Clogstoun VC (13 June 1820 – 6 May 1862) was a recipient of the Victoria Cross, the highest and most prestigious award for gallantry in the face of the enemy that can be awarded to British and Commonwealth forces.

Details
He was a 38 year-old captain in the 19th Madras Native Infantry, Madras Army during the Indian Mutiny when the following deed took place on 15 January 1859, for which he was awarded the VC:

Further information
He later achieved the rank of major and was killed in action, Hingoli, India, on 6 May 1862.
 
His Victoria Cross is displayed at the National Army Museum in Chelsea, England.

References

Indian Rebellion of 1857 recipients of the Victoria Cross
British Indian Army officers
British East India Company Army officers
British Indian Army personnel killed in action
1820 births
1862 deaths
British West Indies recipients of the Victoria Cross
British Army personnel of the Second Anglo-Burmese War